Follo Fotballklubb is a football club from Ski, Viken, Norway.

Follo play in light blue, and their home ground is Ski stadion. It was founded in September 2000 and their biggest achievement was playing in the 2010 Norwegian Football Cup Final.

History
It was founded in September 2000 as an umbrella team for the football departments of five local teams; Ås IL, Oppegård IL, Langhus IL, Ski IL and Nordby IL.

Follo's had a good Norwegian Cup run in 2006, when they made it all the way to the quarter finals, eventually losing at home 0-1 to the cup finalists Sandefjord. But on the way to the quarters they beat defending holders Molde.

Four years later, in 2010, they made it to the Norwegian Cup final, beating Tippeligaen club Lillestrøm 4-2 in the third round, and then later Rosenborg 3-2 in the semi finals. Rosenborg were at the time unbeaten and on top of the Tippeligaen, while Follo were at the bottom of the Adeccoligaen. NRK's match commentator Hallvar Thoresen dubbed Follo's victory against Rosenborg the greatest Norwegian cup shock of all time. In the first cup final in the club's history, Follo lost 2-0 against Strømsgodset.

Thus, despite attaining their best league and cup finish ever, Follo were still relegated to the third tier of Norwegian football. The team managed to stay clear of the relegation zone by the margin of a single point, but were still relegated on account of a clerical error in which they did not finish their application for a 2011 license in time for the 15 September deadline.

Before the 2011 Second Division, Follo was considered one of the favourites to earn promotion back to Adeccoligaen, but when the season was finished Follo was number ten, only four points clear of another relegation.

On July 13, 2012, four players (three of them from Follo) were arrested by police due to match fixing allegations in games involving Follo and Asker Fotball.
 Follo's 4-3 loss after being 3-0 up by Østsiden IL was deemed suspicious because of the odd score line and high bettings placed on this game. The 2012 season saw Follo earn promotion, but the club was relegated after only one season in the 
First Division.

Recent history 
{|class="wikitable"
|-bgcolor="#efefef"
! Season
! 
! Pos.
! Pl.
! W
! D
! L
! GS
! GA
! P
!Cup
!Notes
|-
|2006
|1. divisjon
|align=right bgcolor="#FFCCCC"| 15
|align=right|30||align=right|6||align=right|7||align=right|17
|align=right|46||align=right|76||align=right|25
|Quarterfinal
|Relegated to the 2. divisjon
|-
|2007
|2. divisjon
|align=right |5
|align=right|26||align=right|14||align=right|4||align=right|8
|align=right|48||align=right|30||align=right|49
|Second round
|
|-
|2008
|2. divisjon
|align=right |6
|align=right|26||align=right|10||align=right|7||align=right|9
|align=right|44||align=right|35||align=right|37
||Second round
|
|-
|2009
|2. divisjon
|align=right bgcolor=#DDFFDD| 1
|align=right|26||align=right|19||align=right|3||align=right|4
|align=right|59||align=right|25||align=right|60
||Second round
|Promoted to the 1. divisjon
|-
|2010
|1. divisjon
|align=right bgcolor="#FFCCCC"| 12
|align=right|28||align=right|8||align=right|8||align=right|12
|align=right|35||align=right|43||align=right|32
|bgcolor=silver|Final
|Relegated to the 2. divisjon because license was revoked
|-
|2011 
|2. divisjon
|align=right |10
|align=right|24||align=right|7||align=right|5||align=right|12
|align=right|47||align=right|51||align=right|26
||First round
|
|-
|2012
|2. divisjon
|align=right bgcolor=#DDFFDD| 1
|align=right|26||align=right|18||align=right|2||align=right|6
|align=right|58||align=right|28||align=right|56
||First round
|Promoted to the 1. divisjon
|-
|2013
|1. divisjon
|align=right bgcolor="#FFCCCC"| 15
|align=right|30||align=right|9||align=right|2||align=right|19
|align=right|40||align=right|57||align=right|27
||Third round
|Relegated to the 2. divisjon
|-
|2014
|2. divisjon
|align=right bgcolor=#DDFFDD|1
|align=right|26||align=right|21||align=right|3||align=right|2
|align=right|97||align=right|16||align=right|66
||Third round
|Promoted to the 1. divisjon
|-
|2015 
|1. divisjon
|align=right bgcolor="#FFCCCC"| 13
|align=right|30||align=right|8||align=right|9||align=right|13
|align=right|42||align=right|43||align=right|33
||Second round
|Relegated to the 2. divisjon
|-
|2016 
|2. divisjon
|align=right |5
|align=right|26||align=right|12||align=right|5||align=right|9
|align=right|48||align=right|39||align=right|41
||First round
|
|-
|2017
|2. divisjon
|align=right bgcolor="#FFCCCC"| 14
|align=right|26||align=right|6||align=right|4||align=right|16
|align=right|28||align=right|58||align=right|22
||First round
|Relegated to the 3. divisjon
|-
|2018
|3. divisjon
|align=right| 6
|align=right|26||align=right|9||align=right|8||align=right|9
|align=right|39||align=right|47||align=right|35
||First round
|
|-
|2019
|3. divisjon
|align=right| 3
|align=right|26||align=right|16||align=right|3||align=right|7
|align=right|44||align=right|27||align=right|51
||First round
|
|}

Achievements
Norwegian Cup:
Runners-up (1): 2010

References

External links
 
 Followers Supporters club (archived 9 August 2018)
 European Football Club Ranking (archived 23 September 2010)

Football clubs in Norway
Sport in Akershus
Ski, Norway
Association football clubs established in 2000
2000 establishments in Norway